The 2017 Tour de Luxembourg was the 77th edition of the Tour de Luxembourg cycle stage race. It was held between 31 May and 4 June, as part of the 2017 UCI Europe Tour as a 2.HC event. Defending champion Maurits Lammertink did not compete in the race, as he elected to compete in the partly-concurrent Critérium du Dauphiné event in France.

After winning the second stage of the race, Van Avermaet took the race lead from teammate Jempy Drucker, after finishing second to  rider Anthony Perez the following day. Van Avermaet cemented the race victory by winning the final stage of the race, ultimately winning the race by 29 seconds overall, and winning the points classification as a result.

Perez completed the podium, seven seconds down on Meurisse.

Schedule
The race's start and finish towns were announced through the race's Facebook page on 31 January 2017, with further details announced later in the year.

Teams
14 teams were selected to take place in the 2017 Tour de Luxembourg.  was the only UCI WorldTeam; eight were UCI Professional Continental teams and five were UCI Continental teams.

Stages

Prologue
31 May 2017 — Luxembourg,

Stage 1
1 June 2017 — Luxembourg to Bascharage,

Stage 2
2 June 2017 — Steinfort to Walferdange,

Stage 3
3 June 2017 — Eschweiler to Diekirch,

Stage 4
4 June 2017 — Mersch to Luxembourg,

Classification leadership table
In the 2017 Tour de Luxembourg, four jerseys were awarded. The general classification was calculated by adding each cyclist's finishing times on each stage. Time bonuses were awarded to the first three finishers on all stages except for the individual time trial: the stage winner won a ten-second bonus, with six and four seconds for the second and third riders respectively. Bonus seconds were also awarded to the first three riders at intermediate sprints – three seconds for the winner of the sprint, two seconds for the rider in second and one second for the rider in third. The leader of the general classification received a yellow jersey. This classification was considered the most important of the 2017 Tour de Luxembourg, and the winner of the classification was considered the winner of the race.

The second classification was the points classification. Riders were awarded points for finishing in the top ten in a stage, with the exception of the prologue. Unlike in the points classification in the Tour de France, the winners of all stages were awarded the same number of points. The leader of the points classification was awarded a blue jersey.

There was also a mountains classification, for which points were awarded for reaching the top of a climb before other riders. Each climb was categorised as either first, or second-category, with more points available for the more difficult, higher-categorised climbs. For first-category climbs, the top four riders earned points, while on second-category climbs, only the top three riders earned points. The leadership of the mountains classification was marked by a purple jersey.

The fourth jersey represented the young rider classification, marked by a white jersey. Only riders born after 1 January 1991 were eligible; the young rider best placed in the general classification was the leader of the young rider classification. There was also a classification for teams, in which the times of the best three cyclists in a team on each stage were added together; the leading team at the end of the race was the team with the lowest cumulative time.

Final standings

General classification

Points classification

Mountains classification

Young rider classification

Teams classification

Notes

References

Sources

External links

Tour de Luxembourg
Tour de Luxembourg
Tour de Luxembourg